Maistre Guibert Kaukesel or Hubert Chaucesel (fl.   1230–55) was a trouvère from Arras, where he is named as a canon in a document of the Cathédrale Notre-Dame in 1250. His title indicates he was probably a Master of Arts. He was a member of the literary circle active at Arras mid-century.

Guibert's four surviving chansons courtoises are Chanter voudrai d'amours qui m'est estraigne, Fins cuer enamourés, Quant voi le dous tens aparoir, and Un chant nouvel vaurai faire chanter. He dedicated Fins cuer, which is rare in its isometric hexasyllabic structure, to his fellow Artesians Jehan Erart, Colart le Boutellier, and Dragon (Drogon). All four pieces differ in musical structure. Un chant nouvel is a rotrouenge and Quant voi is the only one in the common bar form. They are melodically simple, restricted in range, and have strong tonal centres.

References
Karp, Theodore C. "Guibert Kaukesel." Grove Music Online. Oxford Music Online. Accessed 20 September 2008. 
Dyggve, Holger Petersen. Onomastique des trouvères. Ayer Publishing, 1973.

Trouvères
13th-century French people
Male classical composers